"Here Comes the Freedom Train"  is a 1976 song written by Stephen H. Lemberg, best known for being performed by American country music artist Merle Haggard and The Strangers.  It was released in May 1976 as the first single from the album My Love Affair with Trains.  "Here Comes the Freedom Train" peaked at number ten on the U.S. Billboard Hot Country Singles chart. It reached number-one on the Canadian RPM Country Tracks in July 1976.

It was originally written for the country music duo of Porter Wagoner and Dolly Parton, who recorded it with special guest Chet Atkins in RCA Studios for release in 1973 by the American Freedom Train Foundation. The 45 single of the recording was sold as a fund-raising item for the bicentennial trip Freedom Train took across the United States.

Content
The song is historical narrative of the United States, which was about to celebrate its Bicentennial.

Personnel
Merle Haggard– vocals, guitar

The Strangers:
Roy Nichols – lead guitar
Norman Hamlet – steel guitar, dobro
 Tiny Moore – mandolin
Eldon Shamblin– guitar
 Ronnie Reno – guitar
 Mark Yeary – piano
 James Tittle – bass
Biff Adam – drums
Don Markham – saxophone

Chart performance

See also
 List of train songs

References

1976 singles
1976 songs
Merle Haggard songs
Song recordings produced by Ken Nelson (American record producer)
Songs about trains
Capitol Records singles